Peter Alan Stuart Leek, OAM (born 27 September 1988) is an Australian former swimmer with ataxic cerebral palsy, who won eight medals at the 2008 Beijing Paralympics.

Early life
Leek was born in the Sydney suburb of Blacktown. He began swimming at the age of eight to aid his disability. He was a member of Ripples St Marys Swimming Club for 13 years. He attended Oxley Park Public School during his primary school years, and then Colyton High School.

Career

His debut in major international competition was at the 2006 IPC Swimming World Championships in Durban, South Africa where he won two gold, two silver and one bronze medals.

At the 2008 Beijing Games in his Paralympic debut, he won three gold medals in the Men's 100 m Butterfly S8, Men's 200 m Individual Medley SM8, and Men's 4 × 100 m Medley 34 pts events, for which he received a Medal of the Order of Australia, four silver medals in the Men's 50 m Freestyle S8, Men's 4 × 100 m Freestyle 34 pts, Men's 400 m Freestyle S8, and Men's 100 m Backstroke S8 events, and a bronze medal in the Men's 100 m Freestyle S8 event. He broke four world records and four Paralympic records.

He competed in the 2010 IPC Swimming World Championships, held in Eindhoven, Netherlands where he won six gold medals and one silver medal. Leek's medals helped Australia's national Paralympic swim team finish sixth overall.

He missed the 2010 Commonwealth Games due to glandular fever. Leek did not return to the pool following this illness. Leek turned to a different passion and graduated from the University of Canberra with a Bachelor of Applied Economics. Following his graduation, Peter began working as a management consultant in health, ageing and human services at KPMG Australia. Leek considers his graduation as one of his greatest achievements.

He was an Australian Institute of Sport scholarship recipient.

Leek is also a committee member for the Friends of Brain Injured Children ACT organisation in Australia.

Recognition
 2008 and 2009: Hawkesbury Sportsperson of the Year. Leek was the first athlete to receive the award in two consecutive years. 
 2008: Junior Athlete of the Year award from the Australian Paralympic Committee. 
 2009: Medal of the Order of Australia.
 2009: New South Wales Disabled Athlete of the Year. 
 Hawkesbury Sportsperson of the Year award in 2008 and 2009, the first athlete to have received the award in two consecutive years. 
 2009: Young Sports Achievement Award Penrith City Council. 
 2010: Swimming Australia's Multi-Class Swimmer of the Year.

References

Bibliography

External links
 

Male Paralympic swimmers of Australia
Swimmers at the 2008 Summer Paralympics
Paralympic gold medalists for Australia
Paralympic silver medalists for Australia
Paralympic bronze medalists for Australia
Recipients of the Medal of the Order of Australia
Australian Institute of Sport Paralympic swimmers
Cerebral Palsy category Paralympic competitors
Swimmers with cerebral palsy
Swimmers from Sydney
1988 births
Living people
World record holders in paralympic swimming
Medalists at the 2008 Summer Paralympics
S8-classified Paralympic swimmers
Medalists at the World Para Swimming Championships
Paralympic medalists in swimming
Australian male freestyle swimmers
Australian male butterfly swimmers
Australian male medley swimmers
21st-century Australian people